The Rivière Noire (English: Black River) is a tributary of the east bank of the Saint-Maurice River, flowing south on  in the territory of Hérouxville from the MRC Mékinac and south-west on  in Shawinigan (Saint-Georges-de-Champlain sector), in the administrative region of Mauricie, in Quebec, in Canada.

Geography 
The Black River draws its sources from a wetland located a few hundred meters north of rang Saint-Pierre-Nord road and from various agricultural streams located west of route 153, west of the village of Hérouxville.

The river flows a priori towards the south in Hérouxville, then enters the territory of the old village municipality of Saint-Georges (today a sector of the city of Shawinigan). Then the river slants to the southwest passing near the Garneau-Jonction train station. In short, the river flows in parallel (on the west side) to the [Canadian National] railway and to route 153.

The waters flow into a long bay which forms an appendix to the artificial reservoir generated by the hydroelectric dam erected on the Saint-Maurice River, in the Saint-Georges-de-Champlain sector of the town of Shawinigan. A magnificent municipal gazebo has been built on the south shore of this narrow bay.

Toponymy 
The Black River toponym was formalized on December 5, 1968 at the Place Names Bank of the Commission de toponymie du Québec.

Notes and references

Appendices

Related articles 
 Hérouxville, municipality
 Mékinac Regional County Municipality
 Saint-Georges-de-Champlain, sector of Shawinigan
 Shawinigan, city
 Saint-Maurice River
 Mauricie
 List of rivers of Quebec

External links 

Rivers of Mauricie
Shawinigan
Mékinac Regional County Municipality